Brent Roske is an American film and television producer, writer and director, directing the upcoming feature film 'Diana In Love' starring Shanti Fiennes (niece of two-time Academy Award nominee Ralph Fiennes) as Princess Diana. Roske is the former Creative Director for NBC Skycastle and MJA Advertising, currently producing content under the banner roske.tv.

Recent works include the feature film 'Diana In Love', starring Shanti Fiennes (niece of Oscar nominee Ralph Fiennes). His works include the 2022 campaign for Radford Motors with TV host Ant Anstead and Formula 1 World Champion Jenson Button, the Emmy nominated TV program Roske on Politics, featuring POTUS candidates, journalists, actors and more, Chasing The Hill with Emmy nominee Robin Weigert, and Courting Des Moines . He lives in Iowa and California with his wife, Dana and daughter. He directed PSAs for 'Justice 4 Vets' with Martin Sheen and the cast of 'The West Wing' and Got Your 6 with singer Gavin DeGraw.

Brent Roske directed and edited the TV special ‘Radford - Cars & Guitars’ for Discovery+.

Roske appears with Oscar nominee Lasse Hallstrom ('Cider House Rules'), BAFTA nominee Colm Bairead ('The Quiet Girl') and actress Shanti Fiennes ('Diana In Love') in an Apple podcast from Film Prestige.

Roske has been nominated for three Emmy Awards and received a Los Angeles Commemorative Emmy Award for producing a special for NBC Sports.

Career

Brent Roske is the former Creative Director for NBC Skyacastle and MJA Advertising. Recent projects include 'Radford: Cars & Guitars' for Discovery+, 'Justice 4 Vets' with Martin Sheen, Oscar winner Allison Janney and the rest of the cast of NBC's 'The West Wing' which premiered at a gala on the Warner Brothers backlot hosted by U.S. Department of Veterans Affairs Secretary Robert McDonald. Roske wrote and directed the political drama Chasing the Hill and the sequel Courting Des Moines. Roske hosted the bi-partisan TV series Roske on Politics (Emmy Award nominee for Best Politics/ Government Program), featuring conversations with the presidential candidates, politicians, journalists, entertainers and community leaders. Roske was a creative director at NBC Universal for nine years earning an Emmy Award and another three at MJA Advertising in Beverly Hills. His works appear at roske.tv.

The Des Moines Register wrote an article titled ‘Consider Iowa - California Transplants Collaborate On Video Praising States Charms’ about a video Roske directed starring professional skateboarder Mike Vallely

Political campaigns
In 2014, Roske ran for US Congress in California's 33rd district while living on a yacht anchored off Marina del Rey."

Roske was an independent candidate in the 2018 Iowa gubernatorial election, and was endorsed by Oscar winner Richard Dreyfuss: "The people of Iowa might look for years for a candidate as bright, committed, and independent in truth and behavior as Brent Roske. I have no doubt in the decency of Brent, in the fierceness of his desire to serve, and for his ability to be truly bi-partisan in his approach," Dreyfuss said in the statement, which was confirmed by his management. "Brent Roske doesn't have a petty bone in his body. He loves the idea of America — almost Jimmy Stewart in Mr. Smith Goes to Washington — and we're going to need many more of his kind in the present and upcoming turmoil of the next few years."  

In 2019, Roske joined the John Delaney 2020 presidential campaign as the Iowa State Director.

The day after the US House of Representatives passed HR51, DC Shadow Senator Paul Strauss wrote: 'In honor of Brent Roske's birthday, I do hereby proclaim him to be an Ambassador of the District of Columbia (AODC) and thank him for all he has done to advance DC Statehood.'

Filmography as director
 Diana In Love (2023)
 Chasing The Hill (2012)

References

Living people
Year of birth missing (living people)
American television hosts
American television directors
American film directors
Regional Emmy Award winners